The UK Singles Chart is one of many music charts compiled by the Official Charts Company that calculates the best-selling singles of the week in the United Kingdom. Before 2004, the chart was only based on the sales of physical singles. This list shows singles that peaked in the Top 10 of the UK Singles Chart during 1995, as well as singles which peaked in 1994 and 1996 but were in the top 10 in 1995. The entry date is when the single appeared in the top 10 for the first time (week ending, as published by the Official Charts Company, which is six days after the chart is announced).

One-hundred and fifty-three singles were in the top ten in 1995. Nine singles from 1994 remained in the top 10 for several weeks at the beginning of the year, while "I Am Blessed" by Eternal was released in 1995 but did not reach its peak until 1996. "Another Day" by Whigfield, "Cotton Eye Joe" by Rednex, "Love Me for a Reason" by Boyzone, "Them Girls, Them Girls" by Zig and Zag and "Think Twice" by Celine Dion were the singles from 1994 to reach their peak in 1995. Sixty-one artists scored multiple entries in the top 10 in 1995. Coolio, Foo Fighters, Mary J. Blige, N-Trance and Supergrass were among the many artists who achieved their first UK charting top 10 single in 1995.

The 1994 Christmas number-one, "Stay Another Day" by East 17 remained at number-one for the first week of 1995. The first new number-one single of the year was "Cotton Eye Joe" by Rednex. Overall, seventeen different singles peaked at number-one in 1995, with Michael Jackson, The Outhere Brothers, Robson & Jerome and Take That (2) having the joint most singles hit that position.

Background

Multiple entries
One-hundred and fifty-three singles charted in the top 10 in 1995, with one-hundred and forty-eight singles reaching their peak this year.

Sixty-one artists scored multiple entries in the top 10 in 1995. The five members of Irish boyband Boyzone (Keith Duffy, Michael Graham, Ronan Keating, Shane Lynch and Stephen Gately) shared the record for the most top ten singles in 1995 with five hit singles each. "Father and Son" was Boyzone's biggest hit of the year: it peaked at number 2 in December and spent eight weeks in the top 10. "Love Me for a Reason" also reached number 2 in January, "So Good" made number 3 in August, and "Key to My Life" charted at the same position in April. The group also gave up their time for the Childliners charity record "The Gift of Christmas", peaking at number nine.

Blur were one of a number of artists with two top-ten entries, including the number-one single "Country House". Bobby Brown, Eternal, M People, Shaggy and Take That were among the other artists who had multiple top 10 entries in 1995.

Chart debuts
Sixty artists achieved their first top 10 single in 1995, either as a lead or featured artist. Of these, eight went on to record another hit single that year: Black Grape, Björk, N-Trance, Nightcrawlers, Paul Oakenfold, Robson & Jerome, Scatman John and Supergrass. Clock, MN8, The Outhere Brothers and Pulp all had two other entries in their breakthrough year.

The following table (collapsed on desktop site) does not include acts who had previously charted as part of a group and secured their first top 10 solo single.

Notes
Italian brothers Gianni and Paolo Visnadi made their chart debuts with two separate acts, charting first as members of Alex Party and later in the year with Livin' Joy. UB40's Ali Campbell charted for the first time as a solo artist in 1995, "That Look in Your Eye" peaking at number five in May. John Reid was credited as a featured artist for the Nightcrawlers single "Surrender Your Love" but he was actually part of the band.

The duo McAlmont & Butler consisted of singer David McAlmont and guitarist Bernard Butler, the latter who was in Suede until his departure the previous year, The group had their first hit with the number 7 single "Animal Nitrate" in 1993. Former Happy Mondays members Shaun Ryder and Mark "Bez" Berry became part of the line-up of newly created Black Grape. Edwyn Collins first found fame with Orange Juice in the mid-1980s but went it alone on number 4 hit "A Girl Like You".

Vic Reeves of the comedy partnership Reeves & Mortimer had previous chart entries to his name with 1991's "Born Free" and "Dizzy". Bob Mortimer was making his debut in the top 10. Suggs launched a solo career while still an active member of Madness, scoring a top 10 single with double-A side "I'm Only Sleeping"/"Off On Holiday".

Ricardo da Force had his first official entry as a featured artist on N-Trance's cover of "Stayin' Alive" but he had performed vocals on The KLF chart topper "3 a.m. Eternal", as well as their other singles "Last Train to Trancentral" and "Justified & Ancient", and Adamski's "The Space Jungle". Prince adopted the new moniker Artist Formerly Known as Prince from 1995 onwards, charting with "Gold" which landed at number ten.

The Childliners charity single "The Gift of Christmas" saw a collective of new and veteran chart acts uniting to raise money for Childline. Members of Boyzone, China Black, East 17, Let Loose and Ultimate Kaos all had previous top 10 credits to their name prior to 1995, as did solo artists C. J. Lewis, Dannii Minogue, Michelle Gayle and West End. Deuce, MN8 and Nightcrawlers all debuted earlier in 1995 but the band members all featured as individuals instead of the group's line-up. A.S.A.P., Backstreet Boys, E.Y.C., Gemini and The Flood were the groups whose line-up's first credit was on this record. Peter Andre and Sean Maguire were the two solo artists for which "The Gift of Christmas" was their first top 10 single of any description.

Songs from films
Original songs from various films entered the top 10 throughout the year. These included "Here Comes the Hotstepper" (from Pret-a-Porter), "Have You Ever Really Loved a Woman?" (Don Juan DeMarco), "Hold Me, Thrill Me, Kiss Me, Kill Me" and "Kiss from a Rose" (Batman Forever), "Shy Guy" (Bad Boys), "Gangsta's Paradise" (Dangerous Minds) and "GoldenEye" (GoldenEye).

Additionally, the K-Klass remix "The Best Things in Life Are Free" from Mo' Money charted in the top ten.  Although the single itself did not promote the film, the music video was assembled from footage of the film.

Charity singles
Several singles raising money for different charitable causes reached the top ten this year. The Comic Relief single was an all-star collaboration between Cher, Chrissie Hynde, Neneh Cherry and Eric Clapton, a cover version of "Love Can Build a Bridge". It topped the chart for one week on 25 March 1995 (week ending).

The charity collective Childliners, which included members of bands including Boyzone, Backstreet Boys and Let Loose, produced a single in aid of Childline entitled "The Gift of Christmas". Its highest position was number 9, which it reached on 16 December 1995 (week ending), staying there for two weeks.

Best-selling singles
Robson & Jerome had the biggest-selling single of 1995 with the double-A side "Unchained Melody"/"White Cliffs of Dover", which spent ten weeks in the top 10 (including seven weeks at number-one), sold over 1.8 million copies and was certified 2× platinum by the BPI. "Gangsta's Paradise" by Coolio featuring L.V. came in second place. Robson & Jerome's "I Believe"/"Up on the Roof",  "Back for Good" from Take That and "Think Twice" by Celine Dion made up the top five. Singles by  Michael Jackson ("Earth Song"), Simply Red, Michael Jackson ("You Are Not Alone"), Everything but the Girl and Oasis were also in the top ten best-selling singles of the year.

"Unchained Melody"/"White Cliffs of Dover" (2) also ranked in the top 10 best-selling singles of the decade.

Top-ten singles
Key

Entries by artist

The following table shows artists who achieved two or more top 10 entries in 1995, including songs that reached their peak in 1994 or 1996. The figures include both main artists and featured artists, while appearances on ensemble charity records are also counted for each artist.

See also
1995 in British music
List of number-one singles from the 1990s (UK)

Notes

 "Another Day" re-entered the top 10 at number 7 on 7 January 1995 (week ending).
 "Riverdance" was performed during the interval of the Eurovision Song Contest in 1994, with Michael Flatley and Jean Butler dancing. It was expanded into a stage musical beginning in Dublin in February 1995.
 Perfecto Allstarz was a pseudonym used by the DJ and producer Paul Oakenfold.
 "The Bomb! (These Sounds Fall into My Mind)" re-entered the top 10 at number 10 on 15 April 1995 (week ending).
 The Bucketheads was a pseudonym used by American DJ Kenny "Dope" Gonzalez.
 "Turn On, Tune In, Cop Out" originally peaked outside the top ten at number 29 in 1993.
 Released as the official single for Comic Relief.
 "We're Gonna Do It Again" was released by Manchester United F.C. to celebrate reaching the FA Cup Final in 1995.
 "Love City Groove" was the United Kingdom's entry at the Eurovision Song Contest in 1995.
 A remixed version of "Scream" on its own was released in the United Kingdom, while it was released elsewhere as a double A-side single with "Childhood".
 The original version of "Don't You Want Me" peaked at number 6 upon its release in 1992.
 "Son of a Gun" originally peaked outside the top ten at number 13 upon its initial release in March 1994.
 "I'll be There for You" re-entered the top 10 at number 10 on 14 October 1995 (week ending). The song was used as the theme song for the American television series Friends.
 The original version of "I Feel Love" peaked at number-one upon its initial release in 1977. A remix of the song by Patrick Cowley was released in 1983 and peaked at number 21 in the UK chart.
 Louise Nurding (known professionally as Louise) left the group Eternal to start a solo career in 1995 and does not appear on either of their top 10 hits this year.
 "Wonderwall" re-entered the top 10 at number 9 on 23 December 1995 (week ending) for 6 weeks.
 Passengers was a pseudonym used by U2 for the Original Soundtracks 1 album project from which "Miss Sarajevo" was taken.
 "The Gift of Christmas" was a charity single released by the collective Childliners to raise money for Childline. 
 Figure includes single that first charted in 1994 but peaked in 1995.
 Figure includes four top 10 hits with the group Boyzone.
 Figure includes an appearance on the Childliners charity record "The Gift of Christmas".
 Figure includes single that peaked in 1994.
 Figure includes three top 10 hits with the group East 17.
 Figure includes three top 10 hits with the group MN8.
 Figure includes two top 10 hits with the group Nightcrawlers.
 John Reid received a featured credit for his band Nightcrawlers single "Surrender Your Love".
 Figure includes a top 10 hit with the group Deuce.
 Figure includes single that peaked in 1996.
 Figure includes a top 10 hit with the group Alex Party.
 Figure includes a top 10 hit with the group Livin' Joy.
 Figure includes a top 10 hit with the group Let Loose.
 Figure includes a top 10 hit with the group Grace.
 Figure includes a single under the pseudonym Perfecto Allstarz.
 Figure includes a single under the pseudonym Passengers.

References
General

Specific

External links
1995 singles chart archive at the Official Charts Company (click on relevant week)
Official Top 40 best-selling songs of 1995 at the Official Charts Company

United Kingdom
Top 10 singles
1995